Ready to Howl is the second studio album by Birds of Maya, released in April 2010 by Richie Records. In 2012, Agitated Records re-issued the album on CD appended with the Regulation 7" single.

Track listing

Personnel
Adapted from the Ready to Howl liner notes.
Birds of Maya
 Jason Killinger – bass guitar
 Ben Leaphart – drums
 Mike Polizze – electric guitar

Release history

References

External links 
 Ready to Howl at Discogs (list of releases)

2010 albums
Birds of Maya albums
Instrumental albums